Harry Conrad Stuttle (February 25, 1879–July 14, 1947) was an American lawyer, judge, and politician.

Stuttle was born in Litchfield, Illinois. He went to the Litchfield public schools and to the University of Illinois. Stuttle was admitted to the Illinois bar and practiced law in Litchfield. He served as state's attorney for Montgomery County, Illinois and as judge for the Litchfield City Court. Stuttle was a Democrat. He served in the Illinois Senate from 1933 to 1941. Stuttle died suddenly at his home in Litchfield, Illinois.

Notes

External links

1879 births
1947 deaths
People from Litchfield, Illinois
University of Illinois alumni
District attorneys in Illinois
Illinois state court judges
Democratic Party Illinois state senators